The discography of American rapper 6ix9ine has released 2 studio albums, 1 mixtape, 29 music videos and 13 singles as lead artist. 9 of his singles have been certified platinum by the Recording Industry Association of America (RIAA) and two gold. His debut mixtape Day69 debuted at number four on the Billboard 200 with 55,000 album-equivalent units, of which 20,000 were pure album sales. His debut studio album Dummy Boy debuted at number two on the Billboard 200 with 66,000 units, including 10,000 pure album sales.

Albums

Studio albums

Mixtapes

Singles

As lead artist

As featured artist

Other charted songs

Music videos

As lead artist

As featured artist

Notes

References

Discography
Discographies of American artists
Hip hop discographies